The London, Midland and Scottish Railway (LMS) Ivatt Class 2 2-6-2T is a class of light 'mixed-traffic' steam locomotive introduced in 1946.

Background 
The LMS had various elderly tank engines and the operating department required a new small class 2 locomotive to replace them. Noting that the Great Western Railway 4500 and 4575 Classes of 2-6-2T ('Prairie') had been successful, George Ivatt designed the new engine type incorporating self-emptying ashpans and rocking grates which were labour-saving devices. A tender version, the Ivatt Class 2 2-6-0 was also produced. The LMS classified them as 2P, but BR preferred the classification 2MT.

Construction 
The class was introduced between 1946 and 1952. They were based on the LMS Stanier 2-6-2T which was, in turn, based on the LMS Fowler 2-6-2T. Ten were built by the LMS before nationalisation in 1948, and were numbered 1200–1209. British Railways added the prefix '4' to their numbers so they became 41200–41209. A further 120 were built by BR, numbers 41210–41329. Most were built at Crewe, including 41272 — the 7000th locomotive to be built there, but the last ten were built at Derby. Fifty engines were fitted with push-pull equipment, these being Nos. 41210–41229, 41270–41289 and 41320–41329.

Service 
The last thirty Crewe-built engines, 41290–41319, were allocated to the Southern Region from new.  The rest were London Midland Region engines. Some were also allocated to the Western Region of BR in the 1950s and 1960s such as numbers 41202, 41203 and 41249 which were shedded at Bristol Bath Road in 1959. They spent their lives mostly on branch line work.

The design formed the basis for the BR Standard Class 2 2-6-2T (numbers 84000–29), which were built to a slightly smaller loading gauge and so have slanted cab sides. These engines also incorporate a fallplate and fittings common to many BR standard classes, such as the chimneys.

In 1957, No. 41224 hauled the first train to pass along the old Stafford and Uttoxeter Railway since closure six years earlier, and the last before the track was dismantled. It was chartered by the Midland area of the Stephenson Locomotive Society and carried more than 220 railway enthusiasts.

Withdrawal
The class were withdrawn between 1962 and 1967.

Preservation 

Four engines have survived to preservation: 41241, 41298, 41312 and 41313, all being Crewe-built examples. All four have steamed in preservation, with 41241 & 41312 working on the main line. 41241 appeared at the Rail 150 Cavalcade at Shildon in 1975, having arrived at the event under its own power. It was also used on the Shildon shuttle trains during the event taking people from the main station at Shildon to the event and also between Darlington and Shildon. 41312 ran on the main line in the late 1990s and early 2000s. As of 2018, all four preserved engines were operational, the latest of them being 41241, which returned to service from an overhaul in June during the K&WVR's 50th anniversary steam gala.

No. 41241 is particularly associated with the Keighley & Worth Valley Railway and when initially preserved was painted in a fictitious maroon livery with K&WVR on the tanks, though it was later restored to more conventional BR black.

During October 2006, the Ivatt Trust loaned the unrestored No. 41313 to the Isle of Wight Steam Railway. In October 2014, it was announced that the engine will be moved to the East Somerset Railway for overhaul. No. 41298 was also moved to the Isle of Wight, and ownership of both these locos was transferred to the Isle of Wight Steam Railway. These locomotives required conversion/fitment of air braking alongside the vacuum brakes as the rolling stock on the island is air-braked. All of the engines apart from 41241 wear authentic British Railways lined black livery with the later BR crest. 41241 presently wears the livery that it wore when the Keighley and Worth Valley Railway was opened in 1968, at the time it wasn't able to wear BR colours.

Models 
Bachmann produced a 00 gauge model in various liveries. Dapol have released a model in British N gauge.

Fiction
Arthur from Thomas & Friends is based on this class, specifically No. 41241 of the Keighley & Worth Valley Railway.

References

External links 

 Class 2MT-A Details at Rail UK
 Southern e-group photos
 Some photos of 41312 on the East Somerset Railway
 Photos of the old Stafford to Uttoxeter Railway Line - including some of the last train No.41224
 Photos of the overhaul of 41313 at the East Somerset Railway

2 Ivatt Class 2 2-6-2T
2-6-2T locomotives
Railway locomotives introduced in 1946
Standard gauge steam locomotives of Great Britain